Adam Burke may refer to:
 Adam Burke (rower), Irish ocean rower
 Adam Burke (comedian) (born 1976), American stand-up comedian, writer, and comic artist
 Adam Burke (animator) (1971–2018), American animator of Toy Story 4